Oskar Hoffmann (October 29, 1866 in Gotha - December 21, 1928 in Wiesbaden) was a German author of science fiction novels.

Der Luftpirat und sein Lenkbares Luftschiff has been attributed to him.

References 

German science fiction writers
1866 births
1928 deaths
German male writers